Myriophyllum pinnatum, common names cutleaf water-milfoil, green parrot's-feather, and pinnate water-milfoil, is a species of Myriophyllum.

Conservation status in the United States
It is listed as endangered in Connecticut. It is also listed as endangered in Indiana New Jersey, New York (state), as "historical" in Kentucky, as threatened in Rhode Island and Tennessee, and as a special concern in Massachusetts.

References

pinnatum
Freshwater plants